Thomas Forsyth (17 May 1868 – 6 February 1941) was a Reform Party Member of Parliament in New Zealand.

Early life
Forsyth was born in Dunedin in 1868. He was the third son of James Forsyth of Dunedin. He received his education at schools in Dunedin and attended the University of Otago. He was prominent in rugby and represented Otago and Wellington.

Professional life
In 1884, Forsyth started to work for Dodgshun and Company, woollen importers. In 1891, when the head office transferred to Wellington, he moved to New Zealand's capital city. He was the manager of Dodgshun and Co. from 1894 to 1898. In 1898, he became the accountant and secretary for the Te Aro House Drapery Company Ltd. He became that company's assistant manager in 1905 and general manager in 1914, a position that he held until 1922, when he started his private accountancy practice.

Public roles

Forsyth was a member of the Wellington Education Board for 18 years, and for 16 of those, he was its chairman. He held governance roles with the Technical College, Wellington College, and Victoria College.

Forsyth was first elected onto Wellington City Council in 1919 and had almost continuous membership until his death. The Civic League nominated him as their candidate for the 1925 mayoralty, but he withdrew in favour of Charles Norwood, who was the successful candidate.

He came second, beaten by Labour's Alec Monteith. He won the Wellington East electorate in the 1925 general election by defeating Monteith. Forsyth was defeated in the next general election in 1928 by Labour's Bob Semple. He stood once more in  but was again beaten by Semple.

In 1935, he was awarded the King George V Silver Jubilee Medal.

Family and death
On 30 August 1894, Forsyth married Elizabeth Smith at Dunedin. She was the eldest daughter of Alexander Smith of Gracefield in County Londonderry, Ireland.

Elizabeth Forsyth died on 26 September 1935 at their Wellington home and was buried at Karori Cemetery in Wellington. Thomas Forsyth died at his son's house in Masterton on 6 February 1941. He is also buried at Karori Cemetery. He was survived by one son and three daughters.

Notes

References

1868 births
1941 deaths
Otago rugby union players
Wellington rugby union players
Reform Party (New Zealand) MPs
New Zealand MPs for Wellington electorates
Wellington City Councillors
Unsuccessful candidates in the 1922 New Zealand general election
Unsuccessful candidates in the 1928 New Zealand general election
Unsuccessful candidates in the 1931 New Zealand general election
Burials at Karori Cemetery
Members of the New Zealand House of Representatives